The Democratic Party "We Are Peru" (PDSP) is a Christian democratic political party in Peru.  It has party committees in nineteen regions of the country.

History

Founding (1997-2000) 
We Are Peru was formed in 1995 under the name of "We Are Lima" (Somos Lima) as a personalist vehicle for mayoral candidate Alberto Andrade who broke from the Christian People's Party. Andrade was elected Mayor of Lima and became a leading figure of the opposition against then-president Alberto Fujimori. He was considered a main contender against Fujimori in the 2000 general election and was fiercely attacked by pro-government media, who successfully sought to diminish his popularity. Eventually, he gained only 3.0% of the votes.

2000s 
At the legislative elections, held on 8 April 2001, the party won 5.8% of the popular vote and 4 out of 120 seats in the unicameral Congress of the Republic.

For the municipal and regional elections of 2002, We Are Peru already had a certain party structure at the national level. So much so that it presents candidates for municipalities and regional governments in many parts of the country.

Andrade, for his part, stood for the second re-election as mayor of Lima. Soon Luis Castañeda Lossio of the National Solidarity Party, a member of the National Unity electoral alliance, would become his main rival during the campaign. Castañeda began to gain a lot of positive image when he began to visit the poorest and most remote areas of Lima. Despite the fact that all the voting intention polls put Andrade as the sure winner, Castañeda in a few weeks managed to tip the electorate in his favor. The results were 39.9% for Castañeda and 29.9% for Andrade.

The party participated in the 2006 elections as part of the Centre Front together with the Popular Action (AP). Alberto Andrade ran as the first running mate of AP leader Valentín Paniagua. Paniagua came in distant fifth with only 5.8% of the vote. In the congressional vote, the alliance won 7.1% of the vote and 5 seats in which, Andrade won a seat in Congress as the only congressman from We Are Peru.  Once installed in the Congress of the Republic, the congressmen elected by the Frente de Centro formed a parliamentary group called the Parliamentary Alliance, together with the two congressmen from Peru Posible and the two from the National Restoration.

2010s 
In the 2011 election, both We Are Peru and AP joined the Possible Peru Alliance and endorsed the presidential candidacy of former President Alejandro Toledo, who finished fourth, while the alliance won 14.8% of the vote in the congressional election and We Are Peru won two seats. In 2013, We Are Peru was involved in the revocation process of the mayor of Lima Susana Villarán and her councilors supporting the “no” option. The party leadership made this decision appealing to considerations of democratic continuity and the need not to interfere in the public works that were being developed in the capital. In the 2016 election, We Are Peru joined the Alliance for the Progress of Peru of César Acuña. The alliance won 9.2% of the popular vote and 9 seats, but We Are Peru did not win a single seat, and was shut from Congress for the first time in 16 years.  In 2018, the former mayor of the District of La Molina, Juan Carlos Zurek Pardo-Figueroa, ran for Mayor of Lima with Somos Perú, finishing in sixth place with 3.59% of the votes of Lima residents.

2020s 
At the legislative elections held on 26 January 2020, after 14 years of participating in electoral coalitions and alliances, the party itself won 6.1% of the popular vote and 11 out of 130 seats in the Congress of the Republic.

On 5 September 2020, Daniel Salaverry announced his official candidacy for the presidency of the Republic for the 2021 general election, under the We Are Peru party in which he had been affiliated since June of the same year. This is the first time that We Are Peru is not participating in coalitions in general elections since its foundation in 2000.

Following the removal of President Martín Vizcarra due to charges of corruption, Martín Vizcarra announced on 27 November 2020 that he would campaign for a seat in congress for the 2021 general election, joining the We Are Peru party which had just voted for his removal weeks before. The We Are Peru party's presidential candidate Daniel Salaverry welcomed Vizcarra to the party. If elected into congress, Vizcarra would obtain parliamentary immunity from the investigations that resulted with his removal from the presidency. When asked if attempting to avoid prosecution for corruption was his motivation to run for congress, Vizcarra stated "One of the flags that I am going to carry in this electoral process, to be fulfilled in Congress if elected, is precisely to completely reform the concept of parliamentary immunity, it cannot be that the Congress of the Republic has used parliamentary immunity". Salaverry ultimately placed 11th in the race with 1.7% of the vote. While Vizcarra was elected to Congress, he was ultimately banned from holding any public offices for 10 years following to the Vacunagate scandal.

Political positions 
The party aligns itself with the Christian Democracy. The party defends solidarity, the importance of the family and the social market economy. According to the ideology of the party, the State should play a promoter role and ensure "that the economy is at the service of man and not man at the service of the economy." In domestic politics, it supports decentralization and respect for the State of law). In foreign policy, it opposes the use of force as a means of dispute resolution and is in favor of Latin American regional integration. Regarding this position, Somos Peru adopts the approaches of the Theory of dependency and promotes integration as a means to collectively overcome underdevelopment.

Electoral history

Presidential election

Elections to the Congress of the Republic

References

External links

1997 establishments in Peru
Christian democratic parties in South America
Conservative parties in Peru
Political parties established in 1997
Political parties in Peru